The black-chinned antbird (Hypocnemoides melanopogon) is a species of bird in the family Thamnophilidae. It is found in Brazil, Colombia, Ecuador, French Guiana, Guyana, Peru, Suriname, and Venezuela. Its natural habitat is subtropical or tropical swamps.

The  black-chinned antbird was described by the English zoologist Philip Sclater in 1857 and given the binomial name Hypocnemis melanopogon.

References

black-chinned antbird
Birds of the Peruvian Amazon
Birds of the Colombian Amazon
Birds of the Venezuelan Amazon
Birds of the Guianas
black-chinned antbird
black-chinned antbird
Taxonomy articles created by Polbot